HYR may refer to:

 Haydons Road railway station, in London, England
 Sawyer County Airport, in Wisconsin, United States